Everblack may refer to:
Everblack (The Black Dahlia Murder album), an album by the American band The Black Dahlia Murder
Everblack (Mercenary album), an album by the Danish band Mercenary